The 2001 Dartmouth Big Green football team was an American football team that represented Dartmouth College during the 2001 NCAA Division I-AA football season. Dartmouth finished second in the Ivy League.

In their sixth season under head coach John Lyons, the Big Green compiled an 8–2 record and outscored opponents 208 to 165. Matthew Mercer was the team captain.

The Big Green's 6–1 conference record placed second in the Ivy League standings. Dartmouth outscored Ivy opponents 116 to 103.

Like most of the Ivy League, Dartmouth played nine games instead of the usual 10, after the school made the decision to cancel its September 15 season opener against Colgate, following the September 11 attacks.

Dartmouth played its home games at Memorial Field on the college campus in Hanover, New Hampshire.

Schedule

References

Dartmouth
Dartmouth Big Green football seasons
Dartmouth Big Green football